Harrow is a science-fiction fantasy novel by Joy Williams, published September 14, 2021 by Knopf Publishing Group.

Reception 
Harrow received starred reviews from Kirkus Books, Booklist, and Publishers Weekly, as well as positive reviews from the Los Angeles Review of Books, Los Angeles Times, New York Review of Books, Wall Street Journal, New Yorker, Star Tribune, Atlantic, Chicago Review of Books, ZYZZYVA, and A.V. Club. The book received a mixed review from The Washington Post and The New York Times.

References 

Kirkus Prize-winning works
2021 science fiction novels
2021 fantasy novels
2021 American novels
Alfred A. Knopf books